Gordon Frazer from the Defence Science and Technology Organisation, Edinburgh, Australia was named Fellow of the Institute of Electrical and Electronics Engineers (IEEE) in 2015 for contributions to advanced over-the-horizon radar.

References 

Fellow Members of the IEEE
Living people
Australian electrical engineers
Year of birth missing (living people)